Icon of Mani (Icon of Mani) is a silk painting hanging scroll from the Yuan or Ming period, from the coastal area of southern China, depicting Mani. The portrait of the founder Mani has been completely Sinicized.

Discovery process 
The black and white photo of this painting was originally published in the 1937 Japanese Oriental Art Periodical "Guo Hua", but did not give the location of the collection and other relevant information. According to the research of Hungarian Asian religious art historian Zsuzsanna Gulácsi, the painting has similar features to the Mani statue depicted in the "Sermon on Mani's Teaching of Salvation". It should be an icon used by Manichae in southern China for religious worship. Originally it was not possible to verify the source, so it is generally believed that it was lost during World War II. However, the documentary linguistics professor Yoshida of Kyoto University discovered the original work of "Icon of Mani" at the Fujita Museum of Art in Osaka, Japan in 2019. Later, the painting was exhibited at the "National Treasure No. Fujita Museum Exhibition" at the Nara National Museum. "On public display.

Gallery 

 Comparison with the "Buddha of Light" statue
The comparison chart made by Zsuzsanna Gulácsi compares the details of the painting with the Mani statue in "Icon of Mani" and the "Buddha of Light" statue of Mani in Cao'an in Quanzhou.

Excursus 

Eight silk hanging scrolls with Manichaean didactic images from southern China from between the 12th and the 15th centuries, which can be divided into four categories:
 Two single portraits (depicting Mani and Jesus)
 Icon of Mani
 Manichaean Painting of the Buddha Jesus
 One scroll depicting Salvation Theory
 Sermon on Mani's Teaching of Salvation
 Four scrolls depicting Prophetology
 Mani's Parents
 Birth of Mani
 Episodes from Mani's Missionary Work
 Mani's Community Established
 One scroll depicting Cosmology
 Manichaean Diagram of the Universe

References 

Chinese Manichaean art
Yuan dynasty art
Ming dynasty painting